Michael D. Wilson was appointed to the Hawaii Supreme Court on April 14, 2014, for a term set to expire on April 16, 2024. Prior to being appointed to the Hawaii Supreme Court, Wilson served as a Circuit Court judge for the Hawaii First Circuit. He previously served as the director of the Hawaii Department of Land and Natural Resources, chair of the Board of Land and Natural Resources, chair of the State Water Commission and a trustee of the Kahoolawe Island Reserve Commission.

Education 
Justice Wilson received his law degree from Antioch School of Law in Washington D.C., and bachelor's degree from the University of Wisconsin-Madison. He was raised in Kailua and graduated from Kailua High School.

References

External links
Honolulu Star-Advertiser: Name in the News: Michael D. Wilson

Living people
David A. Clarke School of Law alumni
Hawaii state court judges
Justices of the Hawaii Supreme Court
University of Wisconsin–Madison alumni
21st-century American judges
Year of birth uncertain
Year of birth missing (living people)